Fakhrabad (also Romanized as Fakhrābād) is a village in Miankuh Rural District, in the Central District of Mehriz County, Yazd Province, Iran. At the 2006 census, its population was 44, in 19 families.

References 

Populated places in Mehriz County